Ben Thomson (born June 30, 1982) is a Canadian former professional ice hockey player.

Thomson played major junior hockey in the Western Hockey League (WHL) with the Medicine Hat Tigers, before attending the University of Alberta where he played CWUAA college hockey with the Alberta Golden Bears. In his first year of college hockey ( 2003–04) Thompson as recognized for his outstanding play when he was awarded the 2003-04 "University of Alberta Hockey Alumni Trophy" as the  CIS (West) Most Outstanding Freshman, and the following year he was awarded the "Major W.J. 'Danny' McLeod Award" as the CIS University Cup Most Valuable Player.

On July 12, 2006, Thompsom signed with the Houston Aeros of the American Hockey League (AHL), and he went on to play 47 games with the AHL team, and also 6 games in the ECHL with the Texas Wildcatters, during  the 2006–07 season.

Thompson moved to Europe for the 2007-08 season where he played 17 games with Klagenfurt AC in the Austrian Hockey League before settling in with the Ravensburg Towerstars of Germany's 2nd Bundesliga where he remained until his retirement from professional hockey following the 2011-12 season. Thompson was a member of the Ravensburg Towerstars when they were crowned the 2010-11 league champions.

Awards and honours

References

External links

1982 births
Living people
Alberta Golden Bears ice hockey players
Canadian ice hockey centres
Houston Aeros (1994–2013) players
EC KAC players
Medicine Hat Tigers players
Texas Wildcatters players
Canadian expatriate ice hockey players in Austria